Well Hungarians (formed 1993 in Cahokia, IL near St. Louis, MO) are an American country music and rock music band.

Members and history
The band consists of Johnny Holzum (vocals, bass, songwriter, founder), Keith Barton (pedal steel guitar, guitar), Greg Bunton (vocals, drums), Joey Miner (vocals, acoustic guitar, fiddle), and Ethan Morris (vocals, electric guitar, piano). To date, the band has released three albums and have charted four  singles. The band was also named New Music Weekly 2006 Country Band of the Year.

Originating from the St. Louis/Southern Illinois area, they have performed in concert with many music greats. The band has charted four consecutive singles from their popular CD's, "Sorry 'bout the Mess" and "Diamonds and Love" the songs have received airplay in the U.S. and ten other countries worldwide. The band was awarded Country Group of the Year in 2006 by New Music Weekly Magazine.

Discography

Studio albums

Singles

References

External links
 Well Hungarians Facebook at Facebook
 

American country music groups
Rock music groups from Missouri
Musical groups established in 1993
Musical groups from St. Louis